Philippine is a small city in the province of Zeeland, Netherlands. It received city rights in 1506.

History 
The landlord, Hieronymus Lauweryn, who founded the town in 1505, named it after Philip I. A fortress was built with a triangular market square. In 1599, a harbour was constructed, and the economy became based on fishing. Philippine was captured by the Dutch Republic in 1633.

The new Assumption of Mary Church was built in 1924 to replace the older church, which has now become a supermarket. It is a domed church with a square tower on the side. The church was destroyed by war in 1944 and rebuilt in 1954.

Philippine has gained some renown for its mussel restaurants. In the village square, there is a fountain in the shape of a mussel. It became the centre of the mussel fishing after 1939 due to the influx of fishermen from the Belgian village  whose river started to silt.

Philippine was a separate municipality until 1970 when it was merged with Sas van Gent. In 2003, it became part of the municipality of Terneuzen.

Gallery

References

External links 
 

Populated places in Zeeland
Former municipalities of Zeeland
Terneuzen